Donna Paukku is a Finnish television series. It first aired on Finnish TV in 2006 and last aired in 2007.

See also
List of Finnish television series

External links
 

Finnish television shows
2006 Finnish television series debuts
2007 Finnish television series endings
2000s Finnish television series
MTV3 original programming